The 708th Volksgrenadier Division (708th People's Grenadier Division), formerly the 708th Infantry Division was a German army division active during World War II. It took part in Operation Northwind, where it was subsequently destroyed.

Operational history 
The 708th Infantry Division was formed from men around Strasbourg in Wehrkreis VIII.

Reactivation
The 708th Division was reactivated in September 1944 as a new Volksgrenadier division, and placed under the leadership of Major Hans-Ludwig Kuhlenkampff on the 10th. The division was sent to occupy and defend Czechoslovakia from the Soviet advance. After two months, the division was sent to the western front as part of the LXIV Army Corps, with Lieutenant Colonel Johannes Marahrens taking over as commanding officer the following January. The division was destroyed the following month in the "Colmar Pocket".

Commanders
Colonel/Major General Walter Drobenig (May 1941 – March 1942)
Lieutenant General Hermann Wilck (March 1942 – July 1943)
Major General Edgar Arndt (July 1943 – August 1944)
Colonel Bruno Gerlock (Acting commander, August 1944)
Colonel Wilhelm Bleckwenn (November 1944 – February 1945)

See also
 List of German divisions in World War II

References 

Volksgrenadier divisions
Military units and formations established in 1941
Military units and formations disestablished in 1945